Potassium dimanganate(III), K6Mn2O6, is a manganese(III) compound. Unlike lithium and sodium manganites, MMnO2, which are best described as mixed oxides, potassium dimanganite contains discrete Mn2O anions in the solid state. It rapidly hydrolyzes in air.

K6Mn2O6 is prepared as ruby-red crystals by the reaction of excess potassium oxide with manganese(II) oxide in a sealed nickel bomb at 610 °C for ten days. The Mn2O anion has an Al2Cl6-type structure.

References

Potassium compounds
Manganese(III) compounds